Florian Bruns (born 21 August 1979) is a German football coach and former player who played as a midfielder. He was the assistant coach of Werder Bremen II and was promoted to interim assistant coach of the professional team of SV Werder Bremen on 12 March 2016. After leaving this post in summer 2017, he joined SC Freiburg in the role of assistant coach.

References

External links
 

1979 births
Living people
Sportspeople from Oldenburg
German footballers
Association football midfielders
Germany under-21 international footballers
SC Freiburg players
1. FC Union Berlin players
Alemannia Aachen players
FC St. Pauli players
SV Werder Bremen II players
Bundesliga players
2. Bundesliga players
Footballers from Lower Saxony